This is a list of active and extinct Volcanoes in Iran.

See also

List of mountains in Iran
Volcanic Seven Summits

References 

Iranian Quaternary volcanoes map by Masoud Eshaghpour: https://pangea.stanford.edu/ERE/db/WGC/papers/WGC/2015/12006.pdf

Iran
 

Volcanoes